Thomas Charles McGrath Jr. (April 22, 1927, Philadelphia, Pennsylvania – January 15, 1994, Delray Beach, Florida) was an American Democratic Party politician who represented New Jersey's 2nd congressional district in the United States House of Representatives from 1965-1967.

Biography
He was born on April 22, 1927 in Philadelphia, Pennsylvania and he graduated from Saint Joseph's Preparatory School in Philadelphia in 1944 and attended the University of Notre Dame from 1944  to 1945. He served in the United States Navy as an enlisted man, June 1945 to November 1945 and graduated from the United States Naval Academy, Annapolis, Maryland, in 1950, and then served in the Atlantic and Pacific Fleets from 1950-1954. He graduated from the University of Pennsylvania Law School in 1957, was admitted to the bar in 1958 and practiced law in Philadelphia until 1963. He was a deputy attorney general of New Jersey in 1964 and practiced law in Atlantic City, New Jersey from 1964-1965.

In his first bid, for elective office, McGrath was elected as a Democrat to the Eighty-ninth Congress, defeating four-term Republican Party incumbent Milton W. Glenn. He served in office from January 3, 1965 to January 3, 1967, and was an unsuccessful candidate for reelection in 1966 to the Ninetieth Congress.

After leaving Congress, McGrath was general counsel at the Department of Housing and Urban Development from 1967–1969; Treasurer of the New Jersey Democratic State Committee from 1969 to 1973 and a consultant in the construction and finance industry from 1969-1992.

McGrath was a resident of Margate City, New Jersey and Juno Beach, Florida, until his death in Delray Beach, Florida, on January 15, 1994.

References

External links

Thomas Charles McGrath Jr. at The Political Graveyard

1927 births
1994 deaths
University of Notre Dame alumni
Democratic Party members of the United States House of Representatives from New Jersey
United States Naval Academy alumni
People from Margate City, New Jersey
People from Palm Beach County, Florida
Politicians from Philadelphia
University of Pennsylvania Law School alumni
20th-century American politicians
Military personnel from New Jersey